Gurakki, also spelt Gorakki, is a village of Haripur District in Khyber-Pakhtunkhwa province of Pakistan. It is part of Kachhi Village Council and is located at 34°6'0N 72°59'0E at an altitude of 847 metres (2782 feet).
The village is at the top of the hills and is connected by a metaled road with Haripur and Kakotri. Most of the population has relocated to urban areas.

References

Populated places in Haripur District